The Advisory Committee on Immunization Practices (ACIP) is a committee within the United States Centers for Disease Control and Prevention (CDC) that provides advice and guidance on effective control of vaccine-preventable diseases in the U.S. civilian population. The ACIP develops written recommendations for routine administration of vaccines to the pediatric and adult populations, along with vaccination schedules regarding appropriate timing, dosage, and contraindications of vaccines.  ACIP statements are official federal recommendations for the use of vaccines and immune globulins in the U.S., and are published by the CDC.

Purpose and impact

The ACIP was established in March 1964 by the US Surgeon General to assist in the prevention and control of communicable diseases, it recommends licensed new vaccines to be incorporated into the routine immunization schedule, recommends vaccine formulations, and reviews older vaccines to consider revising its recommendations.

Both private insurers in the United States and the federal government use ACIP recommendations to determine which vaccines they will pay for.

Recommendation process

Regularly scheduled ACIP meetings are held three times a year.  Notices of each meeting, along with agenda items, are published in the Federal Register in accordance with the requirements of the Federal Advisory Committee Act (FACA).  A vote on vaccine recommendations may be taken when a quorum of at least eight eligible ACIP members are present.  Eligible voters are those members who do not have a conflict of interest.  If there are not eight eligible voting members present, the ACIP executive secretary can temporarily designate ex officio members as voting members, as provided in the committee charter. Meetings are advertised and open to the public, and are now available online via webcast. The minutes of each meeting are available on the CDC website within 90 days of the conference.

In October 2010, ACIP adopted the GRADE (Grading of Recommendations Assessment, Development and Evaluation) framework. Their process includes review of labeling and package inserts; review of the scientific literature on the safety and efficacy; assessment of cost effectiveness; review of the morbidity and mortality associated with the disease; review of the recommendations of other groups; and consideration of the feasibility of vaccine use in existing programs. Each piece of evidence is judged as very low, low, moderate, or high quality. Problems such as lack of reliability and biases are taken into account and the quality of the evidence is adjusted accordingly. Vaccines suitable for nearly all persons in an age- or risk-factor-based group are assigned Category A. Category B recommendations are made for individual clinical decision-making between the patient and physician. Both Category A and Category B vaccines must be covered by insurance companies (following the ACA).

At meetings the ACIP may vote to include new vaccines into the VFC program or to modify existing vaccine schedules. These votes are codified as VFC resolutions. In most cases, a resolution takes effect after establishing a CDC contract for the purchase of that vaccine in the necessary amounts.

Recommendations are then forwarded to the CDC Director for approval. Once approved, the recommendations appear in the CDC's Morbidity and Mortality Weekly Report and represent the official CDC recommendations for immunizations in the US.

Working groups

To ensure thorough review of available information, ACIP often appoints working groups to assist drafting its recommendations, composed of ACIP members, CDC staff and others with immunization expertise. Work groups work year round to catalog specific vaccines and safety information. They review all available scientific information about vaccines which will be discussed at the next ACIP meeting so that they can present the relevant information after the vaccine is licensed at the meeting. Work groups do not vote on the final recommendation.

Members

The ACIP nominally contains fifteen regular members, each an expert in one of the following fields:
immunization practices and public health
use of vaccines and other immunobiologic agents in clinical practice or preventive medicine
clinical or laboratory vaccine research
assessment of vaccine efficacy and safety
consumer perspectives and/or social and community aspects of immunization programs; at least one member must be an expert in this category.

No-one who is currently employed by or involved with any employees of vaccine manufacturing companies or who holds a patent for a vaccine can be a member of ACIP. In addition, the ACIP includes ex officio members from Federal agencies involved with vaccine issues, and non-voting liaison representatives from medical and professional societies and organizations.

Recent recommendations 
On February 26, 2015, ACIP voted to deliver a Category A recommendation for administering MenB vaccines to persons older than 10 years who were at higher risk of meningococcal disease. 

On June 24, 2015, ACIP heard the arguments for recommending Pfizer and Novartis's serogroup B meningococcal vaccines for everyone in the 16-22 age group. The vaccines were licensed to be administered to persons 10 to 25 years of age.  ACIP was unable to grade all of the evidence according to the GRADE system, but they considered the evidence given to be of enough quality to consider a recommendation. The proposed wording was as follows: 

“A serogroup B meningococcal (MenB) vaccine series may be administered to adolescents and young adults 16 through 23 years of age to provide short term protection against most strains of serogroup B meningococcal disease. The preferred age for MenB vaccination is 16 through 18 years of age. (Category B)” 

The motion was passed, 14 to 1.

In 2020 ACIP created a phased vaccine allocation recommendation for the COVID vaccines. A preliminary version of the recommendation prioritized essential workers over people 65 or older. Online commentators criticized the panel for its decision, characterizing the panel as "saying that racial equity considerations militate against prioritizing the elderly even though they concede that doing so would save the most lives of people of all races."

See also

 National Immunization Technical Advisory Group, generic terms for immunization advisory committee 
 Joint Committee on Vaccination and Immunisation, the National Health Service counterpart in the United Kingdom
 National Advisory Committee on Immunization, immunization advisory committee in Canada
 Standing Committee on Vaccination, immunization advisory committee in Germany

References

External links
 ACIP home page

American advisory organizations
Vaccination-related organizations
Medical and health organizations based in Georgia (U.S. state)
Vaccination in the United States